Ronald Alan Fritzsche  (born June 12, 1945) is an American ichthyologist and marine biologist.

Education

Fritzsche attended Hiram W. Johnson High School in Sacramento, California.  He received an A.B. in zoology from Humboldt State College, graduating with highest honors (Chi Sigma Epsilon) in 1967.  He was accepted into the PhD program at Scripps Institution of Oceanography, University of California, San Diego in 1967 and graduated with his PhD in Marine Biology in 1976.

Academic career
Fritzsche was a Research Associate at the Chesapeake Biological Laboratory, University of Maryland from 1975 to 1977.  Fritzsche was an Assistant Professor of Biology at the University of Mississippi from 1977 to 1980.  In 1980, he accepted a faculty appointment in the Department of Fisheries, Humboldt State University (now Cal Poly Humboldt) as an Assistant Professor and Curator of the Fish Collection.  He was promoted to Professor in 1998.  Retiring as Professor and Curator Emeritus in 2004.  He also served as Dean for Research, Graduate Studies and International Programs and Assistant Provost before retirement in 2004.  He was named Outstanding Professor in 1990-1991.He was elected "Fellow" of the American Institute of Fishery Research Biologists in 1988.  And elected Fellow of the Gilbert Ichthyological Society in 1990 and served as the Society's President in 2001.

Fritzsche's primary research focuses on pipefishes, seahorses and their relatives.   However his research also includes early life histories of bony fishes.  Early in his career he became a contributor to the fish identification sheets program developed by the Food and Agriculture Organization, United Nations and continued for two decades.  He has authored or coauthored 53 peer reviewed papers and books.

Selected Publications 
Dawson, C.E. and R.A. Fritzsche.  1975.  Odontoid Processes in pipefish jaws.  Nature 175:390.

Fritzsche, R.A.  1975.  First description of the adult male of Micrognathus brachyrhinus (Pisces:Syngnathidae). Pacific Science 29(3):  267-268.

Fritzsche, R.A.  1976.  A review of the cornetfishes, genus Fistularia (Fistulariidae) with a discussion of intrageneric relationships and zoogeography. Bulletin of Marine Science 26(2): 196-204.

Fritzsche, R.A.  1978.  Development of Fishes of the Mid-Atlantic Bight.  An atlas of egg, larval, and juvenile stages.  Vol. V, Chaetodontidae-Ophidiidae.  FWS/OBS-78/12, U.S. Government Printing Office.  340 pp.

Fritzsche, R.A.  1980.  A revisionary study of the eastern Pacific Syngnathidae (Pisces: Syngnathiformes), including both recent and fossil forms.  Proceedings of the California Academy of Sciences 42(6):  181-227.

Fritzsche, R.A. and G.D. Johnson.  1980.  Early osteological development of white perch and striped bass with emphasis on identification of their larvae.  Transactions of the American Fisheries Society 109(4):  387-406.

Fritzsche, R.A.   1981.  A new species of pipefish (Pisces: Syngnathidae: Micrognathus) from Tahiti.  Proceedings of the Biological Society of Washington 94(3): 771-773.

Fritzsche, R.A.  1982.  Osteichthyes.  858-944 pp.  In:  S.P. Parker (ed.).  Synopsis and classification of living organisms.  McGraw-Hill Book Company, New York.  1232 pp.

Fritzsche, R.A.  1984.  Gasterosteiformes:  development and relationships.  398-405 pp.  In:  	H.G. Moser et al.  (eds.).  Ontogeny and systematics of fishes.  Special Publication Number 1, American Society of Ichthyologists and Herpetologists.  760 pp.

Fisher, R.A., R.A. Fritzsche, and G.L. Hendrickson.  1987.  Histology and ultrastructure of the 'jellied' condition in Dover sole, Microstomus pacificus.  Proceedings of the Fifth Congress of European Ichthyologists, Stockholm 1985.

Johnson, G. D. and R. A. Fritzsche. 1989.  Graus nigra, an omnivorous girellid, with a comparative osteology and comments on relationships of the Girellidae.  Proceedings of the Academy of Natural Sciences of Philadelphia  141:  1-27.

Orr, J.W. and R.A. Fritzsche.  1993.  Revision of the ghost pipefishes, family Solenostomidae (Teleostei: Syngnathoidei).  Copeia 1993(1): 168-182. 

Fritzsche, R.A. and J.W. Cavanagh.  1995.   A guide to the fishes of Humboldt Bay.  HSU Press. 	72pp., 88 color figs.

Orr, J.W., R.A. Fritzsche and John E. Randall. 2002.  'Solenostomous halimeda', a new species of ghostpipefish (Teleostei: Gastersosteiformes) from the Indo-west Pacific Ocean, with a revised key to  the family Solenostomidae. Aqua 5(3): 99-108.

Public service

Fritzsche was elected and served 10 years as the Third Division Commissioner on the board of the Humboldt Bay Harbor Recreation & Conservation District.  He was the primary Commissioner in the development of the Humboldt Bay Management Plan. At the end of is term, the commision passed a resolution commending him for making "major contributions during his tenure to the health of the environment and vitality of Humboldt Bay, including the development of the first ballast-water exchange program on the West Coast."He was also elected and served ten years (2007-2017) of the board of the North Humboldt Recreation and Park District.

References

1945 births
Living people
American ichthyologists
American marine biologists
Scripps Institution of Oceanography alumni
United States Coast Guard personnel
Scientists from San Francisco
California State Polytechnic University, Humboldt alumni
University of Mississippi faculty
Humboldt State University faculty